The 2002 CAF Champions League was the 38th of the CAF Champions League, the Africa's premier club football tournament prize organized by the Confederation of African Football (CAF). Zamalek of Egypt defeated Raja Casablanca of Morocco in the final to win their fifth title. The holders of the 2001 edition, Al Ahly took part in the competition.

Qualifying rounds

Preliminary round

|}

First round

|}
1 The match was played over one leg due to civil unrest and a violent general strike in Madagascar.

Second round

|}

Group stage

Group A

Group B

Knockout stage

Bracket

Semifinals

|}

Final

Top goalscorers
The top scorers from the 2002 CAF Champions League are as follows:

External links
Champions' Cup 2002 - rsssf.com

References

 
1
CAF Champions League seasons